The 1911 Auckland Rugby League season was the second full organised club season in Auckland following the 1910 Auckland Rugby League season. City Rovers won the title again after winning it in the competitions inaugural year.

        
        
        

The club season commenced on 20 May, with the start of the competition for the Myers Cup. City Rovers were crowned champions after defeating Ponsonby United in the final 36–15 which was required due to both teams being within 2 points of each other as the competition entered its closing stages. The competition at the time and for decades to come often did not complete full round robins. When a team had an unassailable lead over their nearest rivals the competition was often concluded at that point. Ponsonby and City had already met twice during the season but rather than conclude the round robin with round 10. In round 10 Ponsonby would have had a bye and City would likely have gained an easy win over wooden spooners, Eden Ramblers so the Auckland Rugby League decided to have the two top teams play off for the title a week early rather than prolong the competition.

The City side featured Albert Asher, Alex Stanaway, Jim Rukutai, and Bob Mitchell, while Ponsonby had Charlie Savory, Charles Dunning and Arthur Carlaw.

Auckland Rugby League news

Club teams and grade participation

Reminiscing about the league's formative years
In 1941 at the annual meeting the chairman of the league in 1911 (Mr. B. Brigham) spoke about the league in its formative years. He said "the seeds sown by the pioneers have developed in a wonderful way... when we first started playing, the matches were at Victoria Park. For funds we used to go around with a hat. Then we started taking boxes round, and if at the end of the day we were "shy", we had to have a tarpaulin just to pay for the ground". He went on to say that "plenty of mud was thrown at us those times, and we had to face a good deal of hostility. Our first meetings were held in the cellar of the Rob Roy Hotel, and then we got the use of the social room in the same hotel. Then we drifted to other rooms, and a home of our own". He also talked of venues and said "at one time the league had a lease of Eden Park at £100 a year, and from there they shifted to Victoria Park, where on one occasion they had a £300 gate, a figure that was not beaten until the 1924 season at Carlaw Park.

Venues 
Unlike in 1910 when only two venues were used, there were 5 venues used. They were Victoria Park, Takapuna Racecourse, 'Avondale', Auckland Domain, and Eden Park (which was the venue for the club final between City Rovers and Ponsonby United.

Eden Ramblers formed 
The senior competition saw the addition of the Eden Ramblers who had been formed in April. A meeting was held at the Avondale Public Hall on Wednesday 26 April with Mr John Bollard, MP presiding over it. He was elected president and chairman, and the name Eden Ramblers was chosen along with the colours or green and gold. The following officers were selected: Hon Secretary, Mr B Boone; Management Committee, W. A. Cummings, J Eddoes, W Fairweather, M Morrow, and J Denyer. The membership was close to 50 and they were to begin their training for the season ahead on 29 April with a joint practice with Ponsonby United at Victoria Park.

Rugby union converts
At the start of the season George Gillett, Arthur Francis, Alan Blakey, and Frank Morse all switched codes. Gillett and Francis had both played for the All Blacks for several seasons and were joining the Newton Rangers along with Blakey who was a well known Auckland rugby player. Morse was joining the City Rovers. Gillett, Francis, and Morse would all go on to represent the Kiwi's.

Representative season 
It featured a representative program in August and September where Auckland played nine matches including two against the New Zealand side. They won eight and lost one. Their first match saw them lose to New Zealand however they rattled off consecutive wins against New Zealand (6 weeks later), Wellington, Lower Waikato, Hawke's Bay, Nelson, Taranaki, Hawke's Bay Māori, and a Country team from Waihi & Rotorua.

Myers Cup (first grade championship)
Eighteen regular season matches were played before the final on 16 September where City Rovers defeated Ponsonby United 36 to 15 to retain the title which they had won in 1910.

First Grade competition

Myers Cup standings 

The second round did not feature the final round of matches hence Ponsonby playing an extra match (when they were due to have a bye), while the table also includes the final played between City and Ponsonby.

Myers Cup results

Round 1

Round 2

Round 3

Round 4 
In the match between Newton and Eden one of the three tries was unattributed but it was said that the try scorers were Short and Linkhorn so one of those players scored twice but it is unknown which.

Round 5

Round 6

Round 7 
The match between Ponsonby and Eden was played on the Avondale Racecourse. The sports fields were located at the eastern end of the racecourse grounds.

Round 8 
In the match between City and Ponsonby at the Takapuna Racecourse there were several injuries. Harrison (City) sprained an ankle, Hunt (City) ruptured the muscles of his shoulder, and Warner (City) had his nose "severely injured in a collision with Carlaw (Ponsonby) who was "partly stunned and sustained a cut to his forehead.

Round 9

Final

Top scorers 
The Ponsonby v Eden match in Round 2 had 23 unattributed points for Ponsonby (5 tries and 4 goals) and 5 for Eden (1 try and 1 goal), while the Round 4 match between Newton and Eden saw a try to Newton unattributed. As such the following lists are likely to omit tries and points for players from those sides.

Lower grades
A junior representative match was played between A and B teams as curtain-raiser to the New Zealand v Auckland match at Takapuna Racecourse on July 29. The match featured Edward Vincent Fox who the Fox Memorial Shield would later be named after.
The teams were; A team: Liversidge (Ponsonby), Hawthorne (City), Herrick (Northcote), Keen (Ponsonby), Edward Fox (North Shore), Sceates (Northcote), Jackson (Northcote), Gault (City), Jordan (Northcote), Boswell (Ponsonby), Hynes (North Shore), Stanaway (Ponsonby), Pugh (Northcote). B Team: Sergeant (Northcote), Ridings (North Shore), Schofield (Ponsonby), Conaghan (North Shore), Neil (Northcote), Gerrard (North Shore), Brown (Ponsonby), Buchanan (North Shore), Vic Barchard (City), Fairweather (Northcote), Young (North Shore), Davies (Ponsonby), McCullagh (City). Emergencies: Young (Ponsonby), Otto, Jonas, Leaity, and Tickner. The match was played in heavy rain and resulted in a 6-all draw.

Second Grade standings
The results are incomplete. There were 10 rounds played but only 11 of the 20 results were reported.
{|
|-
|

Third Grade standings
The results are incomplete. There were 9 rounds played but only 9 results were reported out of 18 matches. Ponsonby initially entered a team in the third grade but failed to play a game before withdrawing.
{|
|-
|

Representative season 
The season began with a match against the New Zealand team which was about to depart for its Australian tour. The touring side won by two points but when they returned from their tour they played again only this time Auckland were the victors by 11 points to 3.

Auckland v New Zealand

Auckland v New Zealand

Auckland v Wellington (Northern Union Cup) 

Ronald (Scotty) McDonald broke his leg during the match. A. Seeling of the Wellington team also badly injured his knee. The team was supposed to go by boat back to Wellington but decided to go by train so they could drop Seeling off in Wanganui where he lived.

Auckland v Lower Waikato 
J Kay had the distinction of playing for Auckland one week, and then turning out against them the following week for Waikato. Occasionally players from the Waikato and Bay of Plenty regions would represent Auckland. Kay played 3 matches for Auckland in this season. The Auckland Star credited a conversion to Jim Griffen while the New Zealand Herald reported that Charles Dunning kicked all 3 goals. As the Auckland Star's match report was more detailed that is the record reported below.

Auckland v Hawke's Bay (Northern Union C.C.)

Auckland v Nelson (Northern Union C.C.) 
For Nelson Dave Mason scored a try, while Oscar Cederman who was later killed in action in Belgium during World War I scored a try and kicked a conversion.

Auckland v Taranaki (Northern Union C.C.)

Auckland v Hawke's Bay Māori

Auckland v Country (Waihi & Rotorua)
A month after Auckland's match with Hawke's Bay Māori an exhibition game was arranged in Waihi against a 'Country' team from that area, including Rotorua players. It was the first ever rugby league match and was played on the Waihi Domain in front of a "fairly large crowd". Despite a few regular forwards not making the trip Auckland still took a strong side to Waihi and ran out winners 20-10. For the Country side Rukingi Reke kicked 2 conversions.

Auckland representative matches played and scorers

References

External links 
 Auckland Rugby League Official Site

Auckland Rugby League seasons
Auckland Rugby League